William C. Rybak (March 2, 1921 – February 3, 2004) was a Democratic member of the Pennsylvania House of Representatives.

References

Democratic Party members of the Pennsylvania House of Representatives
2004 deaths
1921 births
20th-century American politicians